Yashar Vahabzade (born 8 April 1960) is a retired Azerbaijani midfielder.

Career

Club
Yashar Vahabzade began playing football for Soviet Second League side Avtomobilchi in 1977 and would play for the club until 1983.

He made his professional debut in the Soviet Top League in 1983 for Neftchi Baku.

International
Vahabzade made 7 appearances for the Azerbaijan national football team from 1993 to 1995.

Managerial
On 9 January 2015, he has appointed as a head coach of Azerbaijan U21 to replace Bernhard Lippert.

On 1 October 2017, vahabzade left as head coach of Azerbaijan U21

References

1960 births
Living people
Footballers from Baku
Soviet footballers
Azerbaijani footballers
Azerbaijani football managers
Azerbaijan international footballers
FC Baku players
Association football midfielders
Neftçi PFK players
Soviet Top League players